Gregory J. Webb (also known as Greg Webb) is a former police chief of Lyons, Nebraska, who was convicted of killing his disabled neighbor, Anna Anton. After being arrested in Holly Hill, Florida, he entered a plea of no contest to manslaughter and tampering with evidence. He was wanted by the FBI and was captured thanks to the help of a viewer tip after his case aired on the television program Unsolved Mysteries.
In 1993, Webb was arrested in Florida on a murder warrant in the December 1986 shooting death of his neighbor, Anna Anton. He was recognized by a friend, John Brereton, who was watching the NBC program Unsolved Mysteries. Webb was going by the name of Jim Webber and worked as a construction worker. When Brenton recognized his colleague on the program, he alerted the authorities. Anton, 34, disappeared December 15, 1986, and her body was found 12 days later 20 miles north of Lyons. She had been shot three times, and had a slash across her throat. The brutal nature of the crime shocked Americans, for Anton who walked with a cane was a vulnerable target for a senseless killing.

In addition to national exposure for years on Unsolved Mysteries, there were also feature articles by the Associated Press, the Chicago Tribune, the then Cincinnati Post, and Orlando Sentinel, among others.

Webb was released from prison on August 22, 2002. The duplex, where Anton lived in the lower apartment and Webb in the upper, was demolished in 2008. In October 2008, SPIKE TV's revived "Unsolved Mysteries," hosted by Dennis Farina, featured Webb's case again and provided an update on his case.

Footnotes

American people convicted of manslaughter
Prisoners and detainees of Nebraska
1950 births
Living people
People from Lyons, Nebraska